The Georgetown Journal of International Law is a law review published by Georgetown University Law Center. It is among the world's most influential international law journals.

Overview
The Georgetown Journal of International Law (GJIL) is one of the nation's top resources for scholars and practitioners in the field of international law.

The journal was established in 1968 as the Georgetown Journal of Law and Policy in International Business. Nowadays, The Georgetown Journal of International Law publishes on a variety of topics, such as human rights, international humanitarian law, international security, trade, investment, business, taxation, international criminal law, and intellectual property; it also sponsors a bi-annual symposium.

GJIL publishes four issues per year, including an International Trade Review, which offers a comprehensive snapshot of international trade law and includes practitioner commentaries on current developments in the field.

Membership 
Today, GJIL employs approximately 100 second- and third-year law students—about 50 in their graduating year who serve in editorial positions and 50 in intermediate years who serve as staff. The staff collect and check sources, performing technical edits and checking for typographical errors. The upperclass students are tasked with administering the Journal'''s daily operations.

In order to gain journal membership, first-year students are permitted to participate in the Write On competition after completing their final exams in the spring semester. The competition is administered by the Georgetown Law Office of Journal Administration.

Students are offered positions on GJIL'' based on a combination of Write On score, first-year grades, and the candidate's socioeconomic background, including the student's race, sexual orientation, or gender.

References

External links
 

American law journals
Georgetown University academic journals
Quarterly journals
English-language journals
Publications established in 1968
International law journals
Law journals edited by students
Georgetown University Law Center